The common term sand crab can refer to various species of crustacean:

Crustaceans of the superfamily Hippoidea, often known as mole crabs
Hippidae, a family within Hippoidea
Emerita (crustacean), a genus within Hippidae
Crabs of the subfamily Ocypodidae, also commonly known as ghost crabs
Corystes cassivelaunus, found around the North Atlantic, Mediterranean Sea and North Sea
Ovalipes australiensis, found on Australia's south coast
Portunus pelagicus, an Indo-Pacific swimming crab

Animal common name disambiguation pages